Malthe or Malte is a name of possibly Saxon origin. It corresponds to the name Molte and is related to the German name Helmold, composed of words meaning "helmet" and "power".

In the period 1985–1996, 658 Danish boys were named Malthe. According to Statistics in Denmark there were 6298 people named Malthe in Denmark on January 1, 2018 (https://www.dst.dk/da/Statistik/emner/befolkning-og-valg/navne/HvorMange). Malthe is also a Danish name from the Middle Ages.

See also
 Natassia Malthe (born 1974), Norwegian model and actress
 Kim Malthe-Bruun (1923-1945), Danish resistance member during World War II
 Calumma malthe, an animal of the family of Chamaeleonidae
 Malte